Ayman Mohamed Hussein (born 12 December 2000) is a Somali footballer who plays as a defender for Midnimo.

Club career
As of 2019, Hussein plays for Somali First Division club Midnimo.

International career
On 27 July 2019, Hussein made his debut for Somalia in a 3–1 loss against Uganda during the 2020 African Nations Championship qualification.

References

2000 births
Living people
Association football defenders
Somalian footballers
Somalia international footballers